David Allan Gunn-Johnson (born 2 May 1949) is a retired Archdeacon of Barnstaple.

He was educated at St Stephen's House, Oxford, ordained in 1981   and began his career with curacies in Oxhey and Cheshunt. After this he was Team Rector at Colyton and then Rural Dean of Honiton until his archdeacon’s appointment. He was Archdeacon of Barnstaple in the Diocese of Exeter from 2003 until 2014.

References

1949 births
Archdeacons of Barnstaple
Living people